KSCR (1320 AM) was a radio station airing a soft adult contemporary format. Licensed to Eugene, Oregon, United States, the station served the Eugene-Springfield area. The station, established in 1962, was owned by Cumulus Media. It had been granted a construction permit by the U.S. Federal Communications Commission (FCC) to change its transmitter site, and decrease day power to 600 watts and night power to 40 watts.

History
The station, launched in 1962 as KATR, was assigned call sign KZAM on August 20, 1985. On May 1, 1990, the station changed its call sign to KHNN, with an All-News format. On October 1, 1992, it changed to KZZK with the satellite-fed “Z-Rock” format. On September 29, 1995, it became “New Rock” Alternative KNRQ along with 95.3 FM. In late 2000, 1320 KNRQ dropped its simulcast with 95.3 KNRQ-FM, and picked up the Sports format as “1320 The Score.” The call letters were changed on April 26, 2001 to KSCR.

On April 1, 2010, KSCR changed its format from sports (as "The Score") to business news and talk, branded as "1320 Info Radio".

On April 20, 2015, KSCR changed its format to regional Mexican, branded as "1320 Radio Unica", which featured Spanish news and talk programming.

On December 13, 2017, KSCR began stunting with Christmas music, and also began simulcasting on FM translator K251BN (98.1 FM). On January 1, 2018, KSCR launched a soft adult contemporary format.

On July 15, 2021, Cumulus surrendered the licenses of KSCR and K251BN.

Programming
After became business talk radio on 2010, the station featured three local business talk shows, including long-time Eugene talk radio personality Steve Tannen. His show, SportsTalk, was followed by The Writer's Block with The Register-Guard sports columnist George Schroeder and KSCR's Justin Myers. Myers continues with his afternoon drive program, The Sports Idol.

KSCR aired University of Oregon women's basketball as a member of the Oregon Sports Network.

Previous logo

References

External links
FCC Station Search Details: DKSCR (Facility ID: 30649)
FCC History Cards for KSCR (covering as  1959-1981 as KATR / KQDQ)

SCR
Radio stations established in 1962
1962 establishments in Oregon
Cumulus Media radio stations
Radio stations disestablished in 2021
2021 disestablishments in Oregon
Defunct radio stations in the United States
SCR